Operation Concert was a Soviet military operation during World War II, conducted as part of the rail war sabotage campaign. It was one of the largest operations of World War II in its effects on the incapacitation of railroad communications in the logistics of the enemy rear. The operation was conducted through a plan developed by and under the management of the Central Headquarters of the Partisan Movement at the Stavka VGC (Chief Military Committee), and was coordinated with the forthcoming offensive of the Soviet troops in the Smolensk and Gomel directions and intended crossing of the Dnieper as part of the Summer–Autumn Campaign of 1943 (1 July – 31 December). The operation included participation of 193 partisan detachments and groups totalling more than 210,000 men, women, and children.

External links
  Russian Federation Ministry of Defense

Soviet partisans
Military operations of World War II involving Germany
Anti-partisan operations of World War II